Tropical cyclones move into the contiguous United States from the Atlantic Ocean, the Gulf of Mexico, and the eastern Pacific Ocean. The highest rainfall totals in the country have been measured across the Gulf Coast and lower portions of the Eastern Seaboard. Intermediate amounts have been measured across the Southwest, New England, and the Midwest. The northern Great Plains and Pacific Northwest have received the lowest amounts, as those regions lie exceptionally far from the breeding grounds of Atlantic and Eastern Pacific tropical cyclones.

The wettest tropical cyclone in the United States storm on record is Hurricane Harvey, which dumped  of rain on Southeast Texas in 2017. Tropical Storm Claudette holds the national 24-hour rainfall record:  in Alvin, Texas.

Overall wettest

The 10 highest rainfall amounts from tropical cyclones in the United States since 1950, including territories.

Overall wettest in the contiguous United States

The 10 highest rainfall amounts from tropical cyclones in the contiguous United States since 1950. Amelia 1978 held the record until Hurricane Harvey dropped 60.58 inches (1538.7 mm) in 2017.

Alabama

The wettest tropical cyclone to hit the state of Alabama was Hurricane Danny, which stalled over Mobile Bay for over 24 hours.

Alaska
No storm has ever affected Alaska as a tropical cyclone, but extratropical remnants of tropical cyclones have brought heavy rainfall to the state. Examples include the extratropical remnants of Hurricane Fico in 1978.

American Samoa

Tropical cyclones affect the island chain with tropical storm-force winds once every three years, on average.  The wettest known cyclone to affect the island group occurred early in 1966, when nearly  fell at Vaipito.

Arizona

Hurricane Nora was the last tropical cyclone to enter the United States from Mexico at tropical storm strength.  The rainfall which fell across the Harquahala Mountains led to the state's 24-hour rainfall record.

Arkansas

Although having weakened significantly by the time it reached the state, the slow movement of Hurricane Barry over Arkansas led to a widespread and significant flooding event. Murfreesboro saw the greatest rainfall accumulation at 14.58 inches (370.3 mm), which is the highest total ever recorded from a tropical cyclone in the state of Arkansas.

California

One of five known eastern Pacific tropical cyclones to bring tropical storm-force winds to the Southwest, Hurricane Kathleen accelerated northward ahead of an upper-level trough, spreading heavy rains into the transverse ranges of southern California.

Colorado

Few tropical cyclone remnants originating from the eastern Pacific make it as far north as Colorado. Javier dropped locally heavy rainfall exceeding  over the higher terrain of western Colorado in 2004.

Connecticut

While Hurricane Diane is the wettest known tropical cyclone to impact New England, the 1938 New England hurricane produced the most rain in the state of Connecticut. Nonetheless, the flood from Hurricane Diane led to a significant death toll (nearly 200) from Pennsylvania eastward through southern New England.

Delaware

A large swath of heavy rainfall spread associated with a predecessor rainfall event fell before 1933 Chesapeake–Potomac hurricane arrived in Delaware.

Florida

The heaviest rainfall to occur in 24 hours was measured in Yankeetown during Hurricane Easy in 1950, which caused  of precipitation. This is also the highest known point storm total maximum related to any tropical cyclone which has impacted Florida, and by itself would be the highest known rainfall total for any month, or any 24 hour period, from any location within Florida. This rainfall amount remained the national 24-hour rainfall record until Tropical Storm Claudette's landfall in 1979.

Georgia

It also became the wettest tropical cyclone on record for the state of Georgia, eclipsing the record set in 1929.

Guam

Super Typhoon Pamela was not only a wet tropical cyclone for the island of Guam, but a destructive one as well. Since Pamela, wooden structures across Guam have been largely replaced by concrete structures in order to better weather typhoons.

Hawaii

This island state frequently sees rainfall from the remains of former eastern and central Pacific tropical cyclones. However, despite Hawaii's location in the subtropics, direct impacts by tropical cyclones are infrequent due to the protective influence of the Central Pacific tropical upper tropospheric trough (TUTT), which normally dissipates systems approaching Hawaii. This was the most rainfall reported to have been produced by a tropical cyclone within the United States until surpassed by Hurricane Harvey in 2017.

Idaho

Impacts from tropical cyclones in the Pacific Northwest are rare. Most recently, the remains of Olivia moved through the region in 1982, spurring spotty moderate to heavy rainfall across Idaho.

Illinois

Hurricane Audrey directed moisture up to a front to its north across the Midwest during late June 1957 as it transitioned into an extratropical cyclone. Heavy rains fell across central Illinois, leading to the wettest known event to be associated with a tropical cyclone or its remnants across Illinois. More recently, the remnants of Hurricane Ike brought heavy flooding to the Chicago area in September 2008.

Indiana

Indiana experienced its wettest tropical cyclone in 2008 with the arrival of Hurricane Ike. In 1979, Hurricane Bob produced considerable flooding in the state.

Iowa

Hurricane Carla was a large hurricane that moved into Texas during September 1961. As it transitioned into an extratropical cyclone across the Great Plains and Midwest, heavy rain fell in a band on the poleward side of a frontal boundary extending northeast from Carla, leading to the wettest known event to be associated with a tropical cyclone or its remains across Iowa.

Kansas

Heavy rainfall from Tropical Storm Frances fell from the western Gulf Coast northward into the Great Plains. Spreading across portions of Kansas, precipitation included with localized amounts above .

Kentucky

Soon after moving inland, the 1960 Texas tropical storm looped over South Texas, leading to heavy rains along the coastal plain near Port Lavaca. As it moved north-northeast, bursts of heavy rainfall were accompanied with the
system over Arkansas and Kentucky. The maximum in Kentucky not only represents their highest tropical cyclone-related rainfall amount on record, but also the state's all-time 24 hour precipitation record (through 1998).

Louisiana

Heavy rains and flooding are the primary problem associated with tropical cyclones across the Pelican State. Recent examples of flooding across the state from tropical cyclones include Tropical Storm Allison in 2001, Tropical Storm Frances in 1998, Tropical Storm Allison in 1989, and Tropical Storm Claudette in 1979. Three of the four systems stalled across eastern Texas, prolonging the rainfall which occurred over Louisiana. If it were not for the intermittent invasions from tropical cyclones, rainfall during the months of August, September, and October would average about 25% less than it currently does.

Maine

The combined impact from a Nor'easter just one day before Daisy hit, and Hurricane Daisy, caused severe flooding in Maine, when rain fell for 65 consecutive hours in some locations. Rainfall from the two systems caused record rainfall in some areas in Maine. Flooding caused by Hurricane Irene's heavy rainfall washed out two bridges on State Route 27 in Carrabassett Valley.

Maryland

Eloise's remnants brought great moisture to the Northeast third of the United States in the combination of warm, tropical air and cold air from a cold front. From Virginia through New Jersey,  of rain were reported, while New York and Pennsylvania experienced . The 1935 Labor Day hurricane holds the record for producing the most rainfall in Maryland.

Massachusetts

The wettest known tropical cyclone to impact New England is also the wettest known for the state of Massachusetts. The flood from Hurricane Diane led to a significant death toll (nearly 200) from Pennsylvania eastward through southern New England.

Michigan

In 1961, Hurricane Carla generated more precipitation in Michigan than any other tropical cyclone has ever generated in the state. Carla is also the wettest tropical cyclone to have hit Iowa, Nebraska, and Wisconsin.

Minnesota

Few tropical cyclone remnants originating from the eastern Pacific or Atlantic Basins make it as far north as Minnesota. Most recently, 2020's Tropical Storm Cristobal dropped heavy rainfall exceeding  in localized spots.

Mississippi

Hurricane Georges stalled over the southern portion of the state, it produced torrential rainfall, exceeding  locally.

Missouri

Remnant tropical cyclones can move into the state which originate in either the Pacific or Atlantic hurricane basins.  Tropical Storm Erin reintensified over Oklahoma leading to heavy rainfall in that state. As the system moved eastward, its surface low quickly dissipated. However, its mid-level circulation remained robust, leading to a burst of heavy rainfall across Missouri exceeding  in isolated spots, which became the wettest tropical cyclone remnant on record for the state.

Montana

It is rare for tropical cyclone remnants originating from the eastern Pacific or Atlantic Basins to make it as far north as Montana. The remains of Kathleen dropped locally heavy rainfall approaching  in localized spots.

Nebraska

The wettest known event in Nebraska to be associated with a tropical cyclone or its remains was Hurricane Carla. Carla resulted in the heaviest known rainfall in several other states as well.

Nevada

Every few years, Nevada is impacted by eastern Pacific tropical cyclones, or their remnants. The wettest known event for the state was during Hurricane Doreen, when over  fell in isolated spots.

New Hampshire

A large swath of heavy rainfall spread up the East Coast along a frontal zone draping over the northern side of Hurricane Floyd. Nearly  fell across portions of New Hampshire, the most recorded during the passage of a tropical cyclone or its remnants.

New Jersey

A large swath of heavy rainfall spread up the East Coast along a frontal zone draping over the northern side of Hurricane Floyd. Hurricane Four of the September 1940 hurricane season holds the record for the wettest tropical cyclone in New Jersey.

New Mexico

Tropical cyclones, and their remnants, move into New Mexico from both the eastern Pacific and Atlantic basins. Although Atlantic Basin tropical cyclones are more unusual events, the rainfall record for New Mexico was from a tropical depression which moved across Texas from the Gulf of Mexico in October 1954.

New York

Tropical cyclones moving up the East Coast bring rainfall to New York frequently. During Hurricane Connie, over  fell in isolated spots, which was the most rainfall recorded with a tropical cyclone or its remains across the state.

North Carolina

Heavy rains accompany tropical cyclones and their remnants which move northeast from the Gulf of Mexico coastline, as well as inland from the western subtropical Atlantic ocean. As much as 15% of the rainfall which occurs during the warm season in the Carolinas is attributable to tropical cyclones.

North Dakota

It is rare for tropical cyclone remnants originating from the eastern Pacific or Atlantic Basins to migrate as far north as North Dakota. The remains of Javier in 2004 dropped locally heavy rainfall exceeding  in localized spots.

Northern Mariana Islands

The Northern Mariana Islands are an archipelago north of Guam which gets impacted by typhoons in the western Pacific from time to time.  Typhoon Champi dropped  on Tinian in 2015, making it the wettest known tropical cyclone for the island chain.

Ohio

The state of Ohio can be impacted by the remnants of both eastern Pacific and Atlantic tropical cyclones, with a bulk of the activity originating in the Gulf of Mexico.

Oklahoma

Remnant tropical cyclones can move into the state which originate in either the Pacific or Atlantic hurricane basins. In 2007, Tropical Storm Erin reintensified over Oklahoma leading to heavy rainfall within the state. Rainfall exceeded  in isolated spots, which turned out to be the third wettest tropical cyclone remnant on record for Oklahoma.

Oregon

Impacts from tropical cyclones in the Pacific Northwest are rare. Most recently, the remains of Ignacio moved through the region, spurring spotty moderate rainfall across the region.

Pennsylvania

These rains produced widespread severe flooding from Virginia northward to New York, with other flooding occurring over the western portions of the Carolinas.

Puerto Rico

Puerto Rico has seen dramatic rainfall from tropical cyclones and their precursor disturbances. The most recent tropical cyclone-related deluge was from Hurricane Irene in August 2011, when  of rain was measured at Gurabo Abajo.  The heaviest rainfall noted over the past 30 years was from the precursor disturbance to Tropical Storm Isabel, when  fell at Toro Negro Forest. Hurricane Eloise of 1975 dropped  of rainfall at Dos Bocas, with  falling in 24 hours.

Rhode Island

The flood from Hurricane Diane led to a significant death toll (nearly 200) from Pennsylvania eastward through southern New England.

South Carolina

Portions of South Carolina experienced significant rainfall totals eclipsing  with Hurricane Florence, which became the wettest known tropical cyclone to impact the state. The flash flooding covered numerous roadways and washed out bridges. River flooding was great across the state. In addition, the rainfall broke dams, flooded houses, and covered fields.

South Dakota

It is rare for tropical cyclone remnants originating from the eastern Pacific or Atlantic Basins to move as far inland as South Dakota. The remains of Javier in 2004 dropped locally heavy rainfall exceeding  in localized spots.

Tennessee

Tropical Storm Chris moved inland into the Southeast, producing a burst of rainfall across Tennessee exceeding . This system stands as Tennessee's wettest known tropical cyclone.

Texas

The most serious threat from tropical cyclones in Texas residents is from flooding, from both Gulf of Mexico hurricanes and tropical storms and the remnants of Eastern Pacific storms. Systems with sprawling circulations, such as Hurricane Beulah, also tend to make good rainmakers. Slow moving systems, such as Tropical Storm Amelia or Hurricane Harvey also can produce significant rainfall over Texas. Harvey's storm total rainfall is the most recorded within the United States. Harvey's extremely heavy rainfall produced catastrophic flooding across much of southeastern Texas; particularly in and around the Houston metropolitan area, where accumulations exceeded  over a four-day period. Tropical Storm Claudette holds the national 24-hour rainfall record for the United States, with  falling within a day.

United States Virgin Islands

Tropical cyclones affect these islands of the northeast Caribbean on a regular basis.

Utah

On occasion, Utah is impacted by the remnants of eastern Pacific tropical cyclones. The remains of Olivia moved through the region in 1982, spurring spotty moderate to heavy rainfall exceeding  in isolated spots.

Vermont

A large swath over heavy rainfall spread up the East Coast along a frontal zone draped over the northern side of Hurricane Floyd.  Over  fell across portions of Vermont, the most recorded during the passage of a tropical cyclone or its remnants within the state.

Virginia

Virginia has some special considerations that affect tropical cyclone-related rainfall. Mountains to the west act as a perfect mechanism for upward motion during sustained east winds, which can lead to flash flooding and landslides in that region (e.g. Hurricane Camille). As a tropical system approaches from the south, a frontal zone sets up between the moist Atlantic Ocean and the drier landmass to the west. This boundary can set up two or three days in advance of a tropical storm, and can lead up to prolonged heavy rains across coastal sections (e.g. Hurricane Floyd). As the cyclone advances north, the boundary will slowly shift west, but progresses west of a Richmond/Washington, D.C. line.

Washington

Impacts from tropical cyclones in the Pacific Northwest are rare. The remains of Ignacio moved through the region, spurring spotty moderate rainfall across the region.

West Virginia

Although Hurricane Agnes was barely a hurricane at landfall in Florida, its major impact was over the Mid-Atlantic region, where Agnes combined with a non-tropical low to produce widespread heavy rainfall, including amounts approaching  in isolated spots of West Virginia. These rains produced widespread severe flooding from Virginia northward to New York, with other flooding occurring over the western portions of the Carolinas.

Wisconsin

Wisconsin experienced its heaviest tropical-cyclone-related rainfall in 1961 when Hurricane Carla entered the United States. Carla broke the record for highest rainfall in three other states as well.

Wyoming

Few tropical cyclone remnants originating from the eastern Pacific make it as far north as Wyoming.

See also
List of wettest tropical cyclones
List of wettest tropical cyclones by country
Tropical cyclone rainfall climatology
United States rainfall climatology
United States tropical cyclone rainfall climatology

References

External links
Individual Tropical Cyclone Rainfall Pages for United States

Tropical cyclone meteorology
 Wettest United States